Patricia Russo (May 20, 1964) is an American singer and songwriter. She is perhaps best known as Meat Loaf's former female lead vocalist, as she toured the world with his band Neverland Express between 1993 and 2013. Since then, she has embarked on a solo career.

Career (1993–2013)
Patti Russo is featured as Meat Loaf's duet partner on numerous albums, singles and videos. Russo has also been featured as Meat Loaf's opening act, debuting her own original material. She debuted her solo song "Bring Me a Bible and a Beer" during Meat Loaf's shows on the 2008 Casa de Carne Tour.  Russo has recorded duets on all of Meat Loaf's albums since 1995.

Russo has also sung lead vocals with groups such as Trans-Siberian Orchestra (TSO) and Queen. She sang the role of Theresa, Beethoven's Immortal Beloved, on the TSO album Beethoven's Last Night and was featured with TSO as a soloist on the soundtrack to the Jim Carrey movie How the Grinch Stole Christmas. She performed with the rock group Queen, singing lead at the Queen's Day Festival in Amsterdam and at their induction into the Hollywood Walk of Fame. She toured as a soloist with the Jon Tiven Band (in Italy) and the SAS Band (in the United Kingdom). Russo is featured as a lead vocalist in the SAS Band's new DVD Motown 2 Memphis. In 2009-2010, Russo performed in Cher's Las Vegas shows.

As a songwriter, Russo's song "Take Good Care of My Heart" is featured as the theme song in the Warner Brothers feature South Beach Dreams. The song was co-produced by composer-producer Fred Weinberg. She also co-wrote the Meat Loaf single "Runnin' for the Red Light (I Gotta Life)". Her song "Bible and a Beer", co-written with guitarist Jon Tiven, was recorded by jazz singer Betty Harris. Russo's own original recordings can be found on her Spotify page.

As an actress, Russo played the lead role of Esmeralda in the London production of Notre Dame de Paris. She played the character of "Killer Queen" in the Las Vegas version of the musical We Will Rock You, based on the music of Queen. She guest-starred in the New York City musicals The 12 and The Rock Tenor and the Night of Broadway benefit shows.

Russo's television credits include The Tonight Show with Jay Leno, Late Show with David Letterman, The View, Entertainment Tonight, Don't Forget the Lyrics, Qcheck, Huckabee, Lopez Tonight, The USA Music Challenge, Top of the Pops, Brit Awards, American Music Awards, Party in the Park- Hyde Park UK, Prince's Trust - UK, Pres. Clinton's 2nd Inaugural Ball - Washington, D.C., NRL Grand Finals - Sydney, AFL Grand Finals - Melbourne, Night of the Proms - Belgium, Germany, Netherlands. Russo has been featured with Meat Loaf in numerous MTV and VH1 music specials including The History of Meat Loaf Live, Live in the Neighborhood, On Tour (PBS), Behind the Music, VH1: Storytellers, Hard Rock Live, Live in Mexico City and Guilty Pleasure Live.

Russo has performed for numerous charitable benefits including Battersea Dogs and Cats Home, Covenant House, The Painted Turtle, The Prince's Trust, breast cancer research, Hurricane Katrina relief, Blythedale Children's Hospital, Rock Against Cancer, Starkey Hearing Foundation, and Queen AIDS charity concert.

Solo career (2014–present)
Russo pursued a solo career afterwards. She started with the release of an EP and a live tour in April 2014.

HOW ARE YA, 5-0H! tour
Russo's first tour –  HOW ARE YA, 5-0H! – kicked off at The Brook in Southampton on April 10, 2014.

Typical setlist

 "It's a Beautiful Day"
 "Don't Stop Me Now"
 "I'd Lie for You (And That's the Truth)"
 "Bring Me a Bible and a Beer"
 "In the Tomatoes"
 "Black Velvet"
 "Dead Ringer for Love"
 "Vision of You"
 "Here We Are"
 "Baby Love"
 "I Don't Give a Damn"
 "Whole Lot of Nothing"
 "Long Train Running"
 "One Door Opens"
 "River Deep - Mountain High"

Russo also appeared at the Isle of Wight Festival in the Strongbow Garden on Sunday 15 June 2014 and at Sommerfest in Norway in August 2014. She performed 5 shows in 2015 in Wavendon, Bury St. Edmunds, London, Southampton, and Leeds.

In summer 2015 Russo released a new single, titled "When it Comes to Love", with Belgian producers and DJs Regi and Lester Williams. The song was written by Russo and Tonino Speciale and recorded in summer 2014 and was initially being considered for the 2015 James Bond film Spectre. Remixed by Regi and Lester Williams featuring Patti’s original vocals, When it Comes to Love was released on 31 August.

In 2017, Russo toured as a lead vocalist with Symphonic Rhapsody of Queen.

References

External links

 
 
 
 Studio Video 

1964 births
Living people
American women singer-songwriters
American heavy metal singers
American rock songwriters
American women heavy metal singers
American people of Italian descent
Neverland Express members
Singer-songwriters from New Jersey
Meat Loaf